Stadion Bijela or Gradski stadion Bijela is a football venue in Bijela, Herceg Novi municipality, Montenegro. It is used for football matches and is the home ground of FK Bijela.

History
The stadium in Bijela was built soon after the founding of FK Bijela. During 2000, following FK Bijela promotion to the Montenegrin Republic League, the stadium was built with one stand with a capacity of 700 seats. 
The largest crowd at the stadium was recorded at the 2006–07 Montenegrin Cup game FK Bijela - FK Budućnost. The match was attended by 1,000 spectators.
In 2016, local authorities stated that they are planning a reconstruction of the stadium.

Pitch
The pitch measures 110 x 60 meters.

Tenants
Stadium is home of FK Bijela, a member of the Montenegrin Third League. Except their games, during the winter months, because of good climate and accommodation, stadium is used for exhibition matches, tournaments, trainings and preparations of many football teams from the region (Montenegro, Serbia, Macedonia, Albania, Kosovo, Bosnia and Herzegovina and Croatia).

See also
FK Bijela
Bijela
Herceg Novi

References

External links
 Stadium information

Football venues in Montenegro
Football in Montenegro